Helcogramma maldivensis is a species of triplefin blenny in the genus Helcogramma. It was described by Ronald Fricke and John E. Randall in 1992.

References

maldivensis
Endemic fauna of the Maldives
Fish described in 1992